Dong Erdan (born March 1959) is a Chinese physician who is a researcher at Peking University Third Hospital.

Biography
Dong was born in March 1959. After the resumption of National College Entrance Examination, he graduated from Inner Mongolia Medical University in 1983. He obtained his doctor's degree from Beijing Medical University in 1994. He was a postdoctoral fellow at the University of Rochester between 1995 and 1999. He joined the Peking University Third Hospital at the end of 2017.

Honours and awards
 November 22, 2019 Member of the Chinese Academy of Engineering (CAE)

References

1959 births
Living people
Inner Mongolia Medical University alumni
Peking University alumni
Academic staff of Peking University
Members of the Chinese Academy of Engineering